Ked-Air was a planned airline based in Alor Star, Malaysia operating domestic service. The company officially ceased operations in 2006.

History
The airline was established in January 2004 and purposed to start its operations on 20 January 2004. It was also seeking to buy defunct Malaysian airline Pelangi Air.

Services 

Ked-Air planned to commenced regional service between Alor Star and Medan, Indonesia.  However, as of late 2006, the operation has been ceased.

Indonesia
Medan (Polonia International Airport)
Malaysia
Alor Star (Sultan Abdul Halim Airport) (hub)

Fleet 

The airline planned to acquire a Fokker 100 aircraft wet-leased from Indonesian carrier Merpati Nusantara Airlines.:

References

2004 establishments in Malaysia
2006 disestablishments in Malaysia
Defunct airlines of Malaysia
Airlines established in 2004
Airlines disestablished in 2006